Pointer may refer to:

People with the name
 Pointer (surname), a surname (including a list of people with the name)
 Pointer Williams (born 1974), American former basketball player

Arts, entertainment, and media
 Pointer (journal), the official journal of the Singapore Armed Forces
 The Pointer, a 1939 American animated short film
 The Pointer Sisters, an American R&B vocal group formed in 1969

Astronomy
Pairs of stars popularly called "The Pointers": 
Alpha Centauri and Beta Centauri, which point to the Southern Cross
Alpha Ursae Majoris (Dubhe) and Beta Ursae Majoris (Merak), which point to Polaris

Brands and enterprises
 Pointer (wireless phone), a short-lived mobile phone service in Finland in the 1980s
 Pointer Insecticide, a brand of injected Imidacloprid for systemic insect control in trees
 Pointer Telocation, an Israeli company specializing in stolen vehicle recovery

Computing and technology
 Pointer (computer programming), a data type used in programming
 Pointer (user interface), the graphical image which echoes movements of the pointing device, commonly a mouse or touchpad

Devices
 Pointer (rod), an object used to point manually
 Pointer, a dial indicator, that points to a value on a dial or scale
 Pointer, a kind of pencil sharpener used for  diameter lead
 Pointing stick, an isometric joystick used as a pointing device

Dog breeds
 Pointer (dog breed), the English type
 Pointing breed, a group of breeds of hunting dog trained to point at prey

Places
 Pointer, Kentucky
 Pointers, New Jersey
 The Pointers, a pair of rocks off Antarctica

Transport
 FQM-151 Pointer,  a small unmanned aerial vehicle ⋅ 
 Plaxton Pointer, a single-decker bus body
 Volkswagen Pointer, a Brazilian car (built in the 1990s)

Other uses
 Point man, one who takes the front position in a combat military formation

See also
 
 
 Point (disambiguation)
 Pointing (disambiguation)
 Poynter (disambiguation)
 Poynting (disambiguation)